Leon Marcus Morimoto (born 18 December 2001) is a footballer who plays as a left-back for the youth academy of Temperley. Born in the United States, he plays for the Guam national team. Besides the United States, he has played in Argentina.

Career

Morimoto started his career with Temperley.

References

External links
 
 

2001 births
Living people
Soccer players from Honolulu
Guamanian footballers
Guam international footballers
American soccer players
American sportspeople of Japanese descent
Association football fullbacks
Club Atlético Temperley footballers
American expatriate soccer players
American expatriate sportspeople in Argentina
Expatriate footballers in Argentina